P. Rajeev is an Indian politician, who currently serves as the Minister for Industries, Law and Coir in the Government of Kerala. He represents Kalamassery constituency in the Kerala Legislative Assembly.

Early life & career
P. Rajeev was elected to Rajya Sabha on 27 April 2009. He is a native of Meladoor under Trichur District in Kerala State. He was born to late P. Vasudevan (Retired Revenue Inspector) and Radha Vasudevan. 

Rajeev completed his schooling at Government Samithy High School, Meladoor and then joined for his pre degree education at Christ College, Irinjalakuda. He graduated in Economics from the St. Paul's College, Kalamassery and later took his LL.B degree from the Government Law College, Ernakulam. He also holds a diploma in Chemical Engineering from Government Polytechnic College, Kalamassery, where he started his political activism. He was a practising lawyer at the High Court of Kerala before taking full-time political and organizational responsibilities. 

Rajeev is married to Dr. Vani Kesari who is teaching law at the School of Legal Studies, Cochin University of Science and Technology. The couple have two daughters, Hridhya Rajeev and Haritha Rajeev.

Rajeev is one of the Secretariat members of CPI(M) Kerala State committee. He was a member of parliament (Rajya Sabha) from 2009 to 2015. Rajeev had been the most active member of the upper house during his stint and had raised several popular issues in the house. When he retired, leaders from most political parties pleaded with CPI(M) general secretary Sitaram Yechury to consider getting Rajeev elected again to the parliament. He was highly praised for his parliamentary performance by political opponents like former finance minister Arun Jaitley, Congress leader Gulam Nabi Azad, BSP supremo Mayawati and Rajya Sabha deputy chairman P.J Kurien. His Parliamentary performance was highly applauded and was outstanding. He won the Sansad Ratna Award in 2016 for his outstanding contributions in the Parliament.

In 2019 Indian general election, he contested from Ernakulam (Lok Sabha constituency). In 2020, his book Bharanaghadana: Charithravum Samskaravum received the [[Abu Dhabi Sakthi Award|Abu Dhabi Sakthi Award in the scholarly literature category.

In the 2021 Kerala Legislative Assembly Election P Rajeev defeated V. E. Abdul Gafoor of Indian Union Muslim League and got elected from Kalamassery state assembly constituency, Ernakulam District. P Rajeev was included in the second Pinarayi Vijayan ministry as Minister for Industries.

Political career
Rajeev started his public life as an organizer of the Students' Federation of India (SFI) being active from his School days. Later he became the President and then Secretary of SFI Kerala State Committee. He also held positions including the Joint Secretary and Vice President of SFI Central Committee. Later he was active in the Democratic Youth Federation of India (DYFI) where he held the post of district secretary. Rajeev is now a Central committee member of CPI(M). Rajeev also served as the Chief Editor of Deshabhimani Daily.

References

External links
 

Indian communists
Rajya Sabha members from Kerala
Living people
Year of birth missing (living people)
Kerala MLAs 2021–2026
Recipients of the Abu Dhabi Sakthi Award